Mayhem is a 2017 American action comedy film directed by Joe Lynch and written by Matias Caruso. The film was released at the South by Southwest Film Festival in March 2017, and The Sales art and poster was released at the Cannes Film Festival in May 2017. It was released in US cinemas and on VOD and digital HD on November 10, 2017, through RLJE Films.

Plot
Derek Cho tells the audience about the ID-7 "Red Eye" virus, that has been spreading throughout the world. It is not lethal, but infects neural pathways, removing all inhibition and moral integrity, resulting in people acting out their darkest impulses, which may include murder. Nevil Reed commits the first known case of murder driven by ID-7, but he was not deemed liable due to the virus' influence. Derek, a lawyer at Towers and Smythe Consulting (TSC), found the loophole that won Reed's case, earning him a corner office. Derek began his job full of optimism, but quickly lost his moral compass climbing the corporate ladder, even neglecting his family.

One morning, Derek goes into work and meets with a desperate client - Melanie Cross - who needs more time on a loan. Derek thinks he cannot help and calls security on her. After discovering that a bungled legal case for massive company Vanda Corp. has been pinned on him by his superior, Kara Powell ("The Siren", as she has the ear of company head John Towers), Derek confronts her. They plead their cases to Towers, who orders Derek fired. Human resource chief Lester "The Reaper" McGill offers a hefty severance package in return for Derek claiming responsibility. Derek, afraid of being disbarred and sued, rejects this, so security begins escorting Derek out.

Just then, the building is put under quarantine as the ID-7 virus has been detected in the ventilation system. A neutralizing agent was released into the building, with an estimated eight hours for the virus to be obliterated. However, everyone in the building is infected in the meantime, resulting in chaos, violence, and sex.

Derek attempts to take the elevator upstairs to protest to Towers and the board of directors for his job back. Towers instead sends Derek to the basement to be beaten up by Towers' enforcer, Colton "The Bull" Snyder. Derek's friend Ewan arrives to help, but he is accidentally killed by The Bull, further infuriating Derek.

Derek is locked up along with Melanie, who had resisted security. They quarrel but eventually decide to work together. Derek calls Vanda Corp., ensuring his innocence in the mishandled case, and costing TSC a payment from Vanda Corp. Realizing they will not be liable for their actions, Derek and Melanie grab weapons, intending to hold the people on the top floor responsible for their respective bad situations, but they require The Reaper's and Kara's key cards to get there. Derek takes out two security guards sent to attack them.

En route to The Reaper, Derek incapacitates two more guards. The Reaper attacks them; Melanie kills him with a power saw. Derek and Melanie use his card to get up to Kara's office. They duel and brutalize five of Kara's coworkers. Kara offers her card for her safety, but her long-suffering assistant Meg has already destroyed it, having been offered a promotion to do it to protect those upstairs. Meg cuts out The Siren's tongue and kills her. Towers taunts Derek by urinating on Ewan's corpse. Melanie comforts Derek and they have sex.

Needing another method to get upstairs, Derek and Melanie convince the company's one IT worker to hack Irene Smythe's computer, getting her to come down. They offer Smythe's files in exchange for her card and a reversal of her original denial of Melanie's loan extension. Smythe refuses, stating that contracts signed during this period can be invalidated citing the virus. Melanie destroys Smythe's files. The Bull attacks Derek but is killed with a screwdriver. Smythe offers Derek top floor access in exchange for revenge on Melanie. Derek accepts, but sabotages Melanie's restraints. Melanie escapes and kills Smythe with a hammer.

On the top floor, Towers offers Derek a full partnership, but Derek refuses. Derek fends off Towers' assistants and battles Towers. TSC's board give him permission to kill Towers, so Derek punches him off the building to his death just as the quarantine is lifted.

Derek accepts the board's offer of Towers' job. He extends Melanie's loan, then promptly quits the company, and is later seen painting with Melanie. He advises the audience to take control of their own lives before it's too late, accompanied by a shot of Towers hitting the ground.

Cast
 Steven Yeun as Derek Cho
 Samara Weaving as Melanie Cross
 Steven Brand as John "The Boss" Towers 
 Caroline Chikezie as Kara "The Siren" Powell 
 Kerry Fox as Irene Smythe
 Dallas Roberts as Lester "The Reaper" McGill 
 Mark Frost as Ewan Niles
 Claire Dellamar as Meg
 André Eriksen as Colton "The Bull" Snyder
 Nikola Kent as Oswald
 Lucy Chappell as Jenny
 Olja Hrustic as CDC Official
 Bojan Peric as Miles
 Annamaria Serda as Brenda
 Jovana Prosenik as Dena

Production
Mayhem was filmed in Belgrade, Serbia in March, 2016 over 25 days. Joe Lynch explained in an interview the decision came down to cost, saying "we had to find a place that would give us the most amount of days to shoot. We went first to Pittsburgh and they said 15 days. Then we went to New Orleans and they said 17 days. Then we tried Vancouver and they said 18 days. But it was not enough time." Serbia was also the filming location of his previous film, Everly.

Reception
On Rotten Tomatoes, the film has a rating of 85%, based on reviews from 60 critics, with an average score of 7.22/10. The website's critical consensus reads, "Mayhem delivers stylish violence by the bloody bucketful — and grounds all the titular chaos in sharp humor and surprisingly effective real-world economic angst". On Metacritic, the film has a score of 62 out of 100, based on reviews from 13 critics, indicating "generally favorable reviews".

Joe Leydon of Variety called it "A smartly constructed and sardonically funny indie with attitude that somehow manages the tricky feat of being exuberantly over the top even as it remains consistently on target."
Richard Roeper of the Chicago Sun-Times wrote: "Joe Lynch’s fantastically creative, subversive and Tarantino-esque Mayhem stands alone as an entertainingly bloody and dark and twisted social satire — but it’s even more satisfying for those of us who loved Steven Yeun's Glenn on The Walking Dead."

References

External links
 
 
 
 

2017 films
2017 action comedy films
2017 comedy horror films
2010s action horror films
2010s English-language films
American action comedy films
American action horror films
American comedy horror films
Films about viral outbreaks
Films directed by Joe Lynch
Films set in offices
Films shot in Belgrade
2010s American films